Chyliza elegans is a species of rust flies (insects in the family Psilidae). It is found in Taiwan.

References

External links 

 

Psilidae
Insects described in 1913
Taxa named by Friedrich Georg Hendel
Diptera of Asia
Fauna of Taiwan